John Esposito (born 1940) is a professor of International Affairs and Islamic Studies at Georgetown University.

John Esposito may also refer to:

John Esposito, a Bay Shore contractor sentenced in the Katie Beers kidnapping
John Esposito (pianist) (born 1953), American jazz pianist 
John Esposito (poker player), American professional poker player
John Esposito (music executive), American music executive